{{Speciesbox
| fossil_range = 
| image = Xerocrassa geyeri shell 4.png
| image_caption = A shell of Xerocrassa geyeri
| status = DD
| status_system = IUCN3.1
| status_ref = 
| taxon = Xerocrassa geyeri
| authority = (Soós, 1926)
| synonyms_ref = 
| synonyms =
 Helix arceuthophila J. Mabille, 1881
 Helix ycaunica J. Mabille, 1881
 Helix vicianica Bourguignat in Locard, 1882
 Helix deana Berthier, 1884
 Helix pleurestha Berthier, 1884
 Helix (Xerophila) striata Geyer, 1896 (part.);<ref> Geyer D. (1896). Unsere Land- und Süsswasser-Mollusken. Einführung in die Molluskenfauna Deutschlands. Nebst einem Anhang über das Sammeln der Mollusken: i-vi, 1-85, i-xii. Stuttgart.</ref> 1909
 Xerophila geyeri Soós, 1926
 Helicella geyeri (Soós, 1926)
 Trochoidea (Xeroclausa) geyeri (Soós, 1926)
 Trochoidea geyeri Helix llopisi Gasull, 1981
 Trochoidea (Xerocrassa) llopisi Gasull, 1981
}}Xerocrassa geyeriFalkner G., Obrdlík P., Castella E. & Speight M. C. D. (2001). Shelled Gastropoda of Western Europe. München: Friedrich-Held-Gesellschaft, 267 pp. is a species of air-breathing land snail, a terrestrial pulmonate gastropod mollusk in the family Geomitridae. It is also often known as Trochoidea geyeri.

 Taxonomy Xerocrassa geyeri was originally described under the name Xerophila geyeri by the Hungarian malacologist Lajos Soós (1879-1972) in 1926. The specific name geyeri is in honor of the German zoologist David Geyer (1855-1932).  The type specimens are stored in the Natural History Museum of Geneva.

 Shell description Xerocrassa geyeri is a small land snail. The height of the shell is 3.4-6.0 mm, usually 3.5–5 mm. The width of the shell is 5.1(5.0)-8.0 mm.

The shell is globular in its shape. The shell has 4.5-5 whorls. Sometimes there are radial ribs on the surface of the shell forming its shell sculpture. There are usually no periostracal structures, but there can in some cases be hairs and in these cases, after the hairs are gone pits remain on the shel surface especially on the whorl below the apex.  The color of the shell is greyish-white sometimes with one or a few brownish spiral bands.

 Anatomy 
The reproductive system of Xerocrassa geyeri was described by Gittenberger (1993): there is no appendage in the genital atrium, that is the distinguishing characteristic of the genus Xerocrassa Monterosato, 1892. There are two rudimentary dart-sacs near the mucus glands. The flagellum and the epiphallus have approximately the same length.

 Distribution Xerocrassa geyeri lives in Europe, showing a discontinuous, patchy distribution. Today, the species range is mainly Central Europe: parts of Germany and the south of France. Verified recent localities of Xerocrassa geyeri include:
 Gotland, Sweden
 Belgium
 Germany. It is on the Red List of Germany: critically endangered
 Switzerland: endangered
 France
 Spain

 Fossil distribution 
Fossil evidence suggests that current populations of Xerocrassa geyeri are relicts of a much more widespread distribution during more favourable climatic periods in the Pleistocene era. Xerocrassa geyeri fossils are relatively abundant and Xerocrassa geyeri was one of main land snails in the western and southern Europe in glacial periods. In loess deposits, the presence of Xerocrassa geyeri shells has been reported since the early Pleistocene. The subfossilised shell deposits in southern England and large parts of France are correlated with the widespread occurrence of rather arid cold steppe vegetation formations. These formations are associated with transitional phases of Pleistocene climate cycles, covering parts of Europe even during maximal glacial expansion thus providing the potential for local refugia. Both Pleistocene interstadial and pleniglacial periods resulted in altitudinal and latitudinal shiftings of these formations, as well as in reductions in their extent.

The fossil record suggests that the population history of Xerocrassa geyeri is linked to palaeoclimate changes. The latitudinal shifts of suitable habitat during Pleistocene across Europe, driven by climate change, were anticipated by Xerocrassa geyeri in the fossil record with remarkably short time lags. In other words, the species can be detected in the fossil record very soon after the onset of a suitable climate phase. Research by Pfenninger et al. (2003) suggested that the origin of the species is in the Provence from where it expanded its range first to Southwest France and subsequently from there to Germany.Xerocrassa geyeri seems to have survived in local refugia the reduction of the favourable steppe-like habitat due to climatic extremes during the pleniglacial and interstadial periods, as it is the case today. Pfenninger & Bahl (1997) suggested that snail species with restricted dispersal might survive in habitats of a size in the magnitude of few square meters. There is increasing evidence that such small spots with a favourable microclimate existed in the periglacial area of central Europe and were presumed to have provided refuges for comparatively cold resistant snail species. Southern and eastern European refugia were also supplemented by cryptic sanctuaries in northern Europe during the late Pleistocene in shaping present day species composition.

Localities with fossil Xerocrassa geyeri are summarized in Magnin (1989) and they also include:
 United Kingdom:
 southeastern England in interglacial periods: Bramertonian Stage and Cromerian Stage and in Late-Glacial
 Gwithian in Cornwall, south-western England in Late Postglacial in Bronze Age about 3070 ± 103 before present (1993).
 France:
 Côte-d'Or, France in the end of Pliocene and Burgundy, France in Early Pleistocene
 Normandy
 CharenteXerocrassa geyeri can live only in open habitats so it died out in large areas (for example it became extinct in England) when the last glacial period ended and forests started to spread. It had to move to mountains where it survives today.

 Ecology Xerocrassa geyeri is xerophilous species and it is found today in open calcareous or loessic grass and scrublands with a sparse vegetation cover on mountaintops, karstic highland plateaus and disturbed pastures, which are thought to constitute ecological refuges. In southeastern France it inhabits localities from 900 to 1000 m above sea level, but as anomaly it was found also in 370 m above sea level in Mont Vertoux.Xerocrassa geyeri is hermaphroditic species and fertilisation is obligately outcrossing. The main reproduction period is from March to June and from September to October (according to the table values). It lays usually less than 10 uncalcified egss, but sometimes more (according to the table values). Juveniles are hatching from eggs in less than two weeks (according to the table values). They reach sexual maturity in one year and longevity of this species is 1–2 years.Xerocrassa geyeri feeds on dead plants, but rarely also on living plants, epilithic lichens and on algae.  Its active dispersal capacity is about 3 m during its one-year lifetime.  Its competitor may be Candidula unifasciata.

 See also 
Species with similar shell include:
 Helicopsis striata (Müller, 1774)
 Candidula unifasciata (Poiret, 1801)

References
This article incorporates CC-BY-2.0 text from the reference.

 Bank, R. A.; Neubert, E. (2017). Checklist of the land and freshwater Gastropoda of Europe. Last update: July 16th, 2017

 Further reading 
 Soós, L. (1926). Eine neue Xerophila aus Deutschland, Xer. geyeri, und anatomische Bemerkungen über Xer. barcinonensis (Bgt.). Archiv für Molluskenkunde. 58: 98-106, pl. 5. Frankfurt am Main
 Pfenninger M., Bahl A. & Streit B. (1996). "Isolation by distance in a population of a small land snail Trochoidea geyeri: Evidence from direct and indirect methods". Proceedings of the Royal Society of London Series B-Biological Sciences 263(1374): 1211-1217. 
 Prié V. (2005) "Synthèse sur la répartition de Xerocrassa geyeri (Soόs, 1926), Vertigo substriata (Jeffreys, 1833), Argna ferrari blanci (Bourguignat, 1874) et Pagodulina austeniana (Nevill, 1880) dans la marge Sud-Ouest du Massif central. [Synthesis on the distribution of Xerocrassa geyeri (Soόs, 1926), Vertigo substriata (Jeffreys, 1833), Argna ferrari blanci (Bourguignat, 1874) and Pagodulina austeniana (Nevill, 1880) in the south-west margin of the Massif Central]". MalaCo'', Bulletin de la Malacologie Continentale Française 1: 13-16. PDF
 Falkner G., Colling M., Kittel K & Strätz C. (2003). "Rote Liste gefährdeter Schnecken und Muscheln (Mollusca) Bayerns". BayLfU/166/2003: 337-347. PDF

External links 

geyeri
Gastropods described in 1926
Gastropods of Europe